The 2014 1. divisjon was the second tier of Norwegian women's football in 2014. The season kicked off on 21 April 2014, finishing on 26 October 2014.

The top placed team was be promoted to next year's Toppserien. The second placed team contested a playoff against the 11th placed team from the 2014 Toppserien for the right to play in Toppserien next season.

Table
 Sandviken − promoted
 Sarpsborg 08
 Urædd
 Fortuna Ålesund
 Øvrevoll Hosle
 Lyn
 Kongsvinger
 Fart
 Grei
 Åsane
 Kaupanger − relegated
 Fløya − relegated

References

Fotball.no

2014
2
Norway
Norway